Hubert Thomas Spencer (born February 28, 1951) is a retired Major League Baseball outfielder. He played during one season at the major league level for the Chicago White Sox. After his playing career, he began a career managing in the minor leagues. He managed three teams to their league championships: the Asheville Tourists, Geneva Cubs, and Charlotte Knights.

Early life
Spencer was born in Gallipolis, Ohio and graduated from Gallia Academy High School. He played college baseball at the University of Rio Grande.

Coaching and managing
Spencer was the first base coach for the Cleveland Indians in 1998 and 1989. In 2003, Spencer was named the manager of the Memphis Redbirds, the Triple-A affiliate of the St. Louis Cardinals.  However, he was replaced as skipper by Danny Sheaffer in the middle of the 2003 season. It was announced on December 9, 2010 that Spencer was named as the manager of the Lancaster JetHawks, the Advanced Class A affiliate of the Houston Astros, for the 2011 season.

References

External links
"JetHawks Announce Tom Spencer as 2011 Manager". Lancaster JetHawks - News - Press Releases. 9 December 2010.
"Tom Spencer Statistics". The Baseball Cube. 26 January 2008.
"Tom Spencer Statistics". Baseball-Reference. 26 January 2008.
Baseball Almanac

1951 births
Living people
Chicago White Sox players
Major League Baseball outfielders
African-American baseball coaches
African-American baseball players
Baseball players from Ohio
Asheville Tourists managers
Nashville Sounds managers
New York Mets coaches
People from Gallipolis, Ohio
Houston Astros coaches
Cleveland Indians coaches
Tampa Tarpons (1957–1987) players
Fort Myers Sun Sox players
Memphis Redbirds managers
21st-century African-American people
20th-century African-American sportspeople
Charleston Charlies players
Indianapolis Indians players
Iowa Oaks players
Knoxville Sox players
Trois-Rivières Aigles players
Tucson Toros players